

 is a concept for piggybacking (that is, carrying narrow-gauge wagons on broader-gauge flatwagons) by the trainload rather than one wagon at a time.

The need arose when Japan's Hokkaido Railway Company (JR Hokkaido) was planning for standard-gauge Hokkaido Shinkansen high-speed trains to operate in the undersea Seikan Tunnel from 2016. The problem was that narrow-gauge freight trains did not operate at high speeds. Since the tunnel is 53.85 km (33.46 mi) long, incorporating slower trains into the timetable would significantly disrupt high-speed services. The solution was to mount narrow-gauge freight trains on to faster standard-gauge freight trains.

Development
, although the plan had not been implemented, speeds were reported as having been increased to  after extensive testing.

The "Train on Train" concept was announced in 2006 and a full-size mockup vehicle was built and demonstrated at Naebo Works in 2007. The next phase was to build a prototype train for actual operation. JR Freight was developing new Class EH800 20/25 kV AC electric locomotives to haul these and other trains through the tunnel.

A "Forum 2050" presentation by JR Hokkaido in 2010 stated that using a "double traverser" arrangement would allow an entire train to be transferred to and from the Train on Train wagons in approximately 10 minutes.

See also

 Transporter wagon, railway wagons used to carry rail vehicles of different gauge
 Gauge Change Train, an experimental Japanese train designed to operate on both narrow-gauge and standard-gauge routes
 Modalohr
 Piggyback (transportation)
 Roadrailer
 Rollbock
 Variable gauge

References

External links

 Animated video showing operation 

Hokkaido Railway Company
High-speed rail in Japan
Seikan Tunnel
Freight rolling stock